Druon quercuslanigerum is a species of gall wasp that forms galls on Quercus virginiana, Quercus geminata, Quercus fusiformis, and Quercus oleoides. There are both parthenogenic and sexual generations. The parthenogenic generation forms galls on the leaves whereas the sexual generation forms galls on the catkins. It can be found in the southern United States and Mexico. Predators of this species include the Green parakeet.

References

Hymenoptera of North America
Gall-inducing insects
Cynipidae
Oak galls
Insects described in 1881